Fultah Fisher's Boarding House is a 1922 American silent film short and the first film directed by Frank Capra. Based on a poem by Rudyard Kipling, the film is about a prostitute living at a boarding house who provokes a fight that leads to the death of a sailor.

Plot
Fultah Fisher runs a boarding house catering to seamen passing through the port. A local girl known as Anne of Austria has had many lovers amongst the sailors, and is currently linked to Salem Hardieker, a tough Bostonian. When Anne is drawn to a new potential lover, Hans, he rejects her, knowing she's Salem's girl.

Cast
 Mildred Owens as Anne of Austria 
 Ethan Allen as Salem Hardieker 
 Olaf Skavlan as Hans the Dane

Production
Frank Capra, on his first attempt at making a film, managed to write, cast, direct and edit the film all on his own.  The film was shot in San Francisco.

References

Citations

Sources

External links
 
 
 
 

1922 films
1922 comedy-drama films
1920s English-language films
American silent short films
American black-and-white films
Films directed by Frank Capra
1922 directorial debut films
1920s American films
Silent American comedy-drama films